Vinson House may refer to:

in the United States (by state)
Vinson House (Little Rock, Arkansas), listed on the National Register of Historic Places (NRHP)
Vinson House (Rogers, Arkansas), NRHP-listed
Paul L. Vinson House, Sebring, Florida, NRHP-listed
Fred M. Vinson Birthplace, Louisa, Kentucky, NRHP-listed in Lawrence County
Vinson House (Newport, Tennessee), NRHP-listed in Cocke County